The Houston Post was a newspaper that had its headquarters in Houston, Texas, United States. In 1995, the newspaper shut down, and its assets were purchased by the Houston Chronicle.

History
Gail Borden Johnson founded the Houston Post on February 19, 1880. He expanded the paper by acquiring the Houston Telegraph, the legacy of the Telegraph and Texas Register, which operated the first press in Texas after the Texas Revolution. By 1884, however, the paper was financially distressed, when William R. Baker led a group of investors to bailout the publication. Despite their efforts, the original publication ceased in October 1884. The Houston Post was re-established with the merger of the Houston Morning Chronicle and the Houston Evening Journal on April 5, 1885. J. L. Watson was the business manager and Rienzi M. Johnston was the editor. Watson implemented the use of linotype machines to replace the process of manual typesetting. He gained financial control of the paper through acquiring more stock in the company.

Short story writer O. Henry worked briefly for the Post in 1895 and 1896. He had to leave his position at the Post when he was indicted for embezzlement from previous employment at a bank in Austin.

From 1924 to 1983, the Post was owned by the Hobby family, who also began Houston's first radio station, KPRC (AM) in 1925.  Amid declining sales, the Post was sold in 1983 to the Toronto Sun. H&C Communications was created in the aftermath of the sale for the Hobby family to retain control of the broadcasting assets that consisted of TV stations across the U.S., especially local NBC affiliate KPRC-TV, and radio station KPRC (AM).  Four years later, MediaNews Group, led by William Dean Singleton, bought the paper.

The Houston Post building, in the 1970s, had contemporary artwork, slate floors, and wood-grain concrete walls. Tours of the building and its facilities were given at the time.

The Houston Post later closed permanently, with the final edition printed on April 18, 1995. Its assets and liabilities were acquired by Hearst Corporation, the publisher of the Posts rival daily Houston Chronicle. The Hearst Corporation acquired the Houston Post headquarters, which included the newspaper's printing facilities and five offset press lines. Hearst began to use the facilities as part of the production of the Houston Chronicle. Houston Chronicle newspapers were distributed to former Houston Post subscribers. The facility now serves as a Houston Chronicle plant and the headquarters of the Houston Chronicle Spanish newspaper La Voz de Houston.

Final sale
The Hearst Corporation, parent company of the Houston Chronicle, bought out the Houston Post from Consolidated Papers, Inc. on April 18, 1995, ending a 94-year-old crosstown rivalry. Hearst shut the paper down, reportedly for the purpose of eliminating local competition for readership and advertisers. The former owners cited the increasing cost of newsprint, which they had expected to rise up to $39 million from $26 million the previous year. The Houston Post reported an average daily circulation of over 287,000 that year, with a Sunday circulation of almost 317,000. The Houston Post did not announce the sale of the paper in its final edition on April 18.

Availability of Houston Post articles
Some Houston Post articles had been made available in the archives of the Houston Chronicle website, but by 2005 they were removed. The Houston Chronicle online editor Mike Read said that the Houston Chronicle decided to remove Houston Post articles from the website after the 2001 United States Supreme Court New York Times Co. v. Tasini decision; the newspaper originally planned to filter articles not permitted by the decision and to post articles that were not prohibited by the decision. The Houston Chronicle decided not to post or re-post any more Houston Post articles because of difficulties in complying with the New York Times Co. v. Tasini decision with the resources that were available to the newspaper.

People interested in reading Houston Post articles may view them on microfilm. The Houston Public Library has the newspaper on microfilm from 1880 to 1995 and the Houston Post Index from 1976 to 1994. The microfilm of 1880–1900 is in the Texas and Local History Department of the Julia Ideson Building, while 1900–1995 is in the Jesse H. Jones Building, the main building of the Central Library. In addition the University of Houston's main library has the Houston Post available on microfilm from 1880 to 1995 and the Houston Post Index from 1976 to 1979 and from 1987 to 1994. The National Endowment for the Humanities has online searchable past issues of the Houston Post from 1893 to 1903 in the newspaper section. The Dallas Public Library archival collection also has a microfilm collection of the Houston Post from February 23, 1881 – June 1884, March 1887 – December 1906, and June 1977 – March 1995. The collection includes the paper through different title variations, including the Houston Daily Post.

Gallery

See also

 Dan Cook
 Leon Hale
 Mickey Herskowitz
 Marjorie Paxson
 Phi Slama Jama
 List of newspapers in Texas

References

External links
 Rancor and Romance... - Marty Graham
 U.S DOJ approves Hearst purchase of Post (Archive) - U.S. Department of Justice - April 18, 1995
 Guide to the Rienzi Melville Johnston papers, 1899-1926
 Guide to the Marguerite Johnston Barnes Personal Papers, 1926-1998
 
 High-resolution scans of several Houston Post issues from 1890 - 1925 at the University of Houston Libraries
 Post Mortem: Though not unexpected, the death of the Houston Post was still a surprise. 
 Fleck, Tim and Jim Simmon. "Deano's Disclosure: Singleton signed the Posts death warrant long before it expired." Houston Press. June 1, 1995.
 Houston Daily Post  hosted by the Portal to Texas History.
 Houston Post  hosted by the Portal to Texas History.
Dallas Public Library, Dallas History and Archives Newspaper Holdings

1880 establishments in Texas
1995 disestablishments in Texas
Daily newspapers published in Texas
Defunct daily newspapers
Defunct newspapers published in Texas
History of Houston
Newspapers published in Houston
Publications disestablished in 1995
Newspapers established in 1880